Gwak Jae-u (1552–1617) was a Korean military general and patriot from Uiryeong. He was called the "Red Robe General" (천강홍의장군, 天降紅衣將軍) after his habit of wearing a coat made of red silk. In 1592, nine days into the Imjin war, he formed a Righteous army to fight against the Japanese army. He originally did not have an official position, but King Seonjo of Joseon granted him a government position.

Background
Gwak was a Yangban. He had passed the examination to enter the civil service when he was thirty-four, but was denied a post as his essay portion was harshly critical of the government. After that, he decided to give up taking the test and stay in hiding for life.

Raising an army
In 1592, Japanese regent Toyotomi Hideyoshi invaded Korea. Gwak began raising a militia to defend the free parts of Kyongsang province from the invaders.

Gwak Jae-u disrupted Japanese supply lines around the Nakdong River in many guerrilla actions. Gwak also had the distinction of winning Korea's first land victory of the war in the Battle of Uiryeong. In part of a two-pronged offensive into Jeolla, Ankokuji Ekei led 6th division men from the south. Ankokuji needed to cross the Nam River to reach Uiryeong, an objective. He had his men find the shallowest parts of the river and mark them with stakes. While Ankokuji's army slept, Gwak's men moved the stakes to deeper sections of the river. When the crossing began, the Japanese soldiers foundered in the deep water, and Gwak's army attacked them. In multiple attempts to cross the river, Ankokuji suffered many losses, and was forced to abandon his attack on Uiryeong. The battle gave the Korean government respect for Gwak's abilities, and he was placed in command of the Korean forces in and around Uiryeong and the nearby Samga.

Red Robe
While Jae-u's robe is often simply described as red, Samuel Hawley further elaborates that the robe was "dyed in the first menstrual blood of young girls, which he believed suffused the garment with yin energy that would repel the yang energy of Japanese bullets." Jae-u ultimately survived the war and died of old age at an unknown later date.

Legacy

There is a statue of Gwak Jae-u in Mangu Park in Daegu. Also, In Uiryeoung, 'Chungik-sa' enshrine Gwak Jae-u and his 17 subordinate.

See also
Siege of Jinju (1592)
 Japanese invasions of Korea (1592–1598)

References

External links
Encyclopedia of kroean culture-Gwak jae woo
Mangu Park

Korean generals
People of the Japanese invasions of Korea (1592–1598)
1552 births
1617 deaths
16th-century Korean people
Hyeonpung Gwak clan